Frederick Wicks (23 February 1840 –  30 March 1910) was an English author and inventor, whose book The British Constitution and Government was first published in 1871 and ran to several editions. He was born in Stockwell, Surrey, the youngest son of Samuel Wicks (1790-1854), a corn dealer, & Mary Wicks (née Groves) (1797-1868). 

In 1864 Wicks wrote of the events surrounding the trial and execution of Franz Muller.

Frederick Wicks, who in the 1870s became proprietor of the Glasgow Daily News, was in 1878  the inventor of the Wicks Rotary Typecasting Machine. It is recorded  that "for many years he had been working at a machine which would cast new type so quickly and so cheaply as to do away with the old system of distribution and substitute new type every day. In 1899 his machine was practically perfect, and The Times entered into a contract with him to supply any quantity of new type every day. The difficult question of distribution was thus surmounted, and composition by machines placed on a satisfactory basis".

Wicks also wrote several novels, including Golden Lives, The Veiled Hand, and The Infant. He retired to Hersham, Surrey, where he died on 30 March 1910, aged 70.

References

External links
 

1840 births
1910 deaths
People from Stockwell
English inventors
People from Hersham